The North German Confederation Treaty (in German Augustbündnis, or Alliance of August) (also called the North German Federation Treaty and the Treaty of 18 August 1866) was the treaty between the Kingdom of Prussia and other northern and central German states that initially created the North German Confederation, which was the forerunner to the German Empire. This treaty, and others that followed in September and October, are often described as the August treaties, although not all of them were concluded in August 1866.

The treaties followed the Austro-Prussian War of Summer 1866, after which the German Confederation of 1815 was dissolved. The treaties established:
 a military alliance, and
 an agreement to transform the alliance into a nation state, based on the Prussian reform plan for the German Confederation

The German states involved arranged the election of a North German parliament in February 1867. The parliament on the one hand, and the governments on the other, agreed on a constitution for the North German Confederation on 1 July 1867. This Confederation, a federal state, was expanded in 1870–71 with the south German states and became the German Empire. The August treaty of 1866, therefore, can be seen as the first legal document that established the modern German nation state.

Signing and contents
The treaty was signed at Berlin on 18 August 1866, between the preliminary and the final peace treaty between Austria and Prussia, which formally ended the Austro-Prussian War. Initially, the treaty bound the parties into a military alliance and an agreement to negotiate the creation of a formal federation. The treaty specified that if no agreement on confederation had been reached by August 1867, the duty to negotiate would expire after one year.

The full name of the treaty, translated to English, is Treaty of Alliance between Anhalt, Bremen, Brunswick, Hamburg, Lippe, Lübeck, Oldenburg, Prussia, Reuss-Schleitz, Saxe-Altenburg, Saxe-Coburg-Gotha, the Grand Duchy of Saxony, Schaumberg-Lippe, Schwarzburg-Rudolstadt, Schwarzburg-Sondershausen, and Waldeck and Pyrmont, signed at Berlin on 18 August 1866.

The leading Prussian politician was Otto von Bismarck, who had been chancellor since 1862. While the national liberals of Prussia urged him to force a national constitution on the smaller states of Northern and Central Germany, Bismarck had the intention to spare their feelings and to create the new state based on formal agreements. It was also a signal to the South German states, which Bismarck wanted to incorporate later. Bismarck drafted the constitution, which was changed by the allied governments and by the Reichstag, the North German parliament.

Parties
The Kingdom of Prussia was the dominant party to the treaty. The other parties to the treaty pledged their military forces under the command of the King of Prussia. 

The following states signed the treaty on 18 August and submitted ratifications on 8 September 1866:

 Duchy of Anhalt

 Duchy of Brunswick

 Principality of Lippe
 Free City of Lübeck
 Grand Duchy of Oldenburg

 Principality of Reuss-Gera
 Duchy of Saxe-Altenburg
 Saxe-Coburg and Gotha

 Principality of Schaumburg-Lippe
 Schwarzburg-Rudolstadt
 Schwarzburg-Sondershausen
 Principality of Waldeck

The following states submitted ratifications or accessions to the agreement at dates later in 1866:

 Grand Duchy of Mecklenburg-Schwerin
 Grand Duchy of Mecklenburg-Strelitz
 (northern parts only)
 Principality of Reuss-Greiz
 Duchy of Saxe-Meiningen

The Duchy of Lauenburg was not formally a member of the treaty, but it was implicated in the agreement because its duke was, from 1865, the Prussian king.

At the same time, the original East Prussian craddle of the Prussian statehood as well as the Prussian-held Polish- or Kashubian-speaking territories of Province of Posen, West Prussia, the Lauenburg and Bütow Land and Draheim were formally annexed into Germany.

Notes

References
Clive Parry (ed), Consolidated Treaty Series (Dobbs Ferry, NY: Oceana, 1969) vol. 133, pp. 39–48 (text of treaty in German and English).
James Wycliffe Headlam, Bismarck and the Foundation of the German Empire (New York: Putnam, 1899), ch. 12.

1866 treaties
19th-century military alliances
Military alliances involving Prussia

Treaties of the Duchy of Anhalt
Treaties of Bremen (state)
Treaties of the Duchy of Brunswick
Treaties of Hamburg
Treaties of the Grand Duchy of Hesse
Treaties of the Principality of Lippe
Treaties of the Free City of Lübeck
Treaties of the Grand Duchy of Mecklenburg-Schwerin
Treaties of the Grand Duchy of Mecklenburg-Strelitz
Treaties of the Duchy of Oldenburg
Treaties of the Kingdom of Prussia
Treaties of the Principality of Reuss-Gera
Treaties of the Principality of Reuss-Greiz
Treaties of the Duchy of Saxe-Altenburg
Treaties of Saxe-Coburg and Gotha
Treaties of the Duchy of Saxe-Meiningen
Treaties of the Grand Duchy of Saxe-Weimar-Eisenach
Treaties of the Kingdom of Saxony
Treaties of the Principality of Schaumburg-Lippe
Treaties of Schwarzburg-Rudolstadt
Treaties of Schwarzburg-Sondershausen
Treaties of Waldeck (state)
1866 in Prussia
1866 in Germany
August 1866 events